"Tears in the Morning" is a song by the American rock band the Beach Boys from their 1970 album Sunflower. Written by Bruce Johnston, it was issued as a single, with the B-side "It's About Time". The single failed to chart in the U.S., but reached the top 5 in the Netherlands.

Personnel

Sourced from Craig Slowinski and Timothy White.

The Beach Boys
 Al Jardine – harmony and backing vocals
 Bruce Johnston – lead vocals, harmony and backing vocals, Rocksichord, grand piano (during coda), production
 Mike Love – harmony and backing vocals
 Brian Wilson – harmony and backing vocals
 Carl Wilson – harmony and backing vocals, guitar
Additional musicians
 Ronald Benson – guitar, mandolin
 Ray Pohlman – bass
 Daryl Dragon – vibraphone
 Hal Blaine – drums
 Carl Fortina – French concertina
 Igor Horoshevsky – cello
 Anatol Kaminsky, Sam Freed, Marvin Limonick, David Frisina, George Kast, Nathan Kaproff, Alexander Murray, Dorothy Wade – violins
 Virginia Majewski, Robert Ostrowsky, Alvin Dinkin, Allan Harstian – violas
 Edgar Lustgarten – cello
 Abe Luboff – arco double bass
 unknown – trombone
Production staff
 Michel Colombier – arranger 
 Stephen Desper – engineer

Cover versions 
 Belgian pop band The Radios covered the song in their 1990 album No Television.

 Norwegian stoner rock band Thulsa Doom recorded a cover version of this song in 2005 for their album Keyboard, Oh Lord! Why Don't We?.

Charts

References

1970 songs
The Beach Boys songs
Songs written by Bruce Johnston
Song recordings produced by the Beach Boys